Wattignies-la-Victoire is a commune in the Nord department of northern France. It is close to the site of the Battle of Wattignies, fought in 1793 during the French Revolutionary Wars, in which the French scored a victory over Austria.

Heraldry

Population

See also
Communes of the Nord department

References

Wattignieslavictoire